The Modau is a  right tributary of the river Rhine running through the German state of Hesse. Historically, there have been many watermills on the river and its tributaries, giving rise to the name Mühltal ("Mill Valley"), a district through which the river flows. It passes through Ober-Ramstadt and Pfungstadt, and flows into a branch of the Rhine in Stockstadt am Rhein.

Erosion 
Due to erosion of the river, it was needed to place various stones into the channel bed of the river to prevent abrasion, hydraulic action and early attrition

See also
 List of rivers of Hesse

References

Rivers of Hesse
Rivers of Germany